Leon Taljaard Nature Reserve is a nature reserve located north west of Vryburg, South Africa. The Swartfontein resort is located adjacent to the reserve. The reserve has a number of animal species including Rhino, Eland, Buffalo, Black Wildebeest, Waterbuck and Springbok. It is open daily to the public.

110 species of birds have been registered in the reserve.

There is a small memorial plaque and a museum here in memory of the Boer prisoners who were executed by the British army.

History 
The Leon Taljaard Nature Reserve was opened on 12 February 1972 by Mr. Frans D. Conradie.

References

 Vryburg 1882-1982 

Protected areas of North West (South African province)
Nature reserves in South Africa
Protected areas established in 1972